Lejla Basic (born 3 October 1994) is a Swedish football midfielder who played for KIF Örebro DFF.

Career
Basic began her career with KIF Örebro in 2013. She helped lead the club to promotion during the 2018 season.

Basic made one appearance for the Bosnia and Herzegovina women's national football team, a 1–2 defeat to Croatia in a friendly on 9 June 2017.

References

External links 
 

1994 births
Living people
Swedish women's footballers
Women's association football midfielders
KIF Örebro DFF players
Damallsvenskan players
Bosnia and Herzegovina women's international footballers
Place of birth missing (living people)